Alfred Naifeh  (5 January 1915 – 16 October 1942) was a law professional, and a U.S. Naval World War II hero.

Biography
Alfred Naifeh was born 1915 in Covington, Tennessee, to a Lebanese immigrant family from Jdeidet Marjeyoun, Lebanon, and was raised in Norman, Oklahoma. He graduated from the University of Oklahoma in 1937 with a BA and in 1940 with an LL.B. (law degree). Awarded a Cook Fellowship at the School of Law, University of Michigan, receiving his LLM degree in 1941. Member of the Oklahoma Bar Association, American Bar Association, Phi Beta Kappa fraternity, and Order of the Coif.

Following graduation, he served as law clerk in Oklahoma City for Federal Judge Alfred P. Murrah of U.S. Circuit Court of Appeals of the 10th Judicial District when he was called to active duty, 5 July 1941, while a member of the Naval Reserve. World War II began and on July 5, 1941, Naifeh received commission as an ensign in the Supply Corps.

On February 27, 1942, Ensign Alfred Naifeh was assigned to the USS Meredith (DD-434) as destroyer division disbursing officer. On October 1, 1942 he was promoted to lieutenant (junior grade).

During the Battle of the Solomons Islands, the ship, USS Meredith, was struck by a massive Japanese air raid and rapidly sunk. Lieutenant (Junior Grade) Naifeh worked through the night and for two days and nights to locate and keep his wounded shipmates and place exhausted survivors aboard life rafts.
As a result of his continuing valiant efforts to save his shipmates which ultimately resulted in his death, he was completely overcome by exhaustion and on the third day, he died of exhaustion after fighting off shark attacks and rescuing shipmates.

Lieutenant (Junior Grade) Naifeh was posthumously awarded the Navy and Marine Corps Medal and the Purple Heart for his heroics, his devotion to duty, and courage.

In 1944, The US Navy named the USS Naifeh (DE-352), a John C. Butler-class destroyer escort ship, after him. At the time of Alfred's death his mother, Rathia Naifeh, was a resident of Norman, Oklahoma. On February 29, 1944, his mother christened the ship at Orange, Orange County, Texas. Commissioned, the ship began its career in convoy duty. In June 1946, the ship was decommissioned and sat idle for four and a half years in the Pacific Reserve Fleet. In January 1951, the USS Naifeh was reinstated to assist in the Korean War. It was engaged in extensive patrol, mine sweeping, ASW and shore bombardment activities.

Awards and decorations
  Purple Heart
  Navy and Marine Corps Medal

References

 Caldwell, Tom (1986), From the Hills of Lebanon: The Syrian-Lebanese in Oklahoma, The Chronicles of Oklahoma
 The Arab American Almanac, 5th edition
 Arab American Historical Foundation
 Arab-American's serving in the United States military
 (MHPP) Marjeyoun Heritage Preservation Program

American people of Lebanese descent
People from Norman, Oklahoma
1915 births
1942 deaths
University of Michigan Law School alumni
United States Navy personnel killed in World War II